The 2010 Vattenfall Cyclassics was a one-day road race, which is part of the 2010 UCI ProTour, it took place on 15 August 2010.

Teams
Twenty one teams were invited to the 2010 Vattenfall Cyclassics.

Teams from the UCI Pro Tour

Teams awarded a wildcard invitation

Results

External links
 2010 Vattenfall Cyclassics

2010 UCI ProTour
2010 UCI World Ranking
2010 in German sport
2010